The following lists events that happened during 2013 in Yemen.

Incumbents
President: Abd Rabbuh Mansur Hadi

Events

February
 February 19 - A Yemeni Air Force plane crashes in Sana'a, killing 12 people and injuring 11 others.
 February 23 - Three people are killed and 14 injured in clashes between civilians and government security forces in Aden and Mukalla, as thousands turn up for a day of planned protests. In a separate attack, a senior Yemeni security chief and two of his bodyguards are injured in a shooting.

March
 March 21 - Three members of Ansar al-Sharia and two pro-government militia fighters are killed in an attack in Abyan Governorate.
 March 22 - Two al-Qaeda fighters and two pro-government militiamen are killed in clashes in Jaar.

April
 April 8 - 4 army deserters and 3 tribesmen are killed in clashes in Al Bayda Governorate.
 April 27 - Five Yemeni soldiers and two al-Qaeda militants are killed in fighting in the central town of Rada. A senior intelligence officer is also gunned down by a drive-by shooting in the south.

 
Yemen
Yemen
Years of the 21st century in Yemen
2010s in Yemen